Anthene krokosua, the Krokosua ciliate blue, is a butterfly in the family Lycaenidae. It is found in Ghana.

References

Butterflies described in 2005
Anthene
Endemic fauna of Ghana
Butterflies of Africa